Various cheeses have been called the king of cheeses. The title is informal, and there is no standard definition, but a few are more consistently called that than others, especially in their countries of origin:

 Parmigiano Reggiano
 Brie de Meaux: Congress of Vienna (1814). In fact, it was declared "" ("prince of cheeses, and first among desserts"), which only later became "king of cheeses, cheese of kings".
 Roquefort: Frédéric Leblanc du Vernet, 1869
 Époisses: Brillat-Savarin, early 19th century
 Stilton (1912)
 Cheddar

Cheeses are idiosyncratically named "kings" of particular kinds of cheese by individual writers: Maroilles, the king of strong cheeses; Halloumi, the "king of cooking cheeses"; Västerbotten, the king of Swedish cheeses.

Sometimes lower ranks of nobility are used for other cheeses, e.g., Camembert, the "prince" of cheeses.

Notes

Cheese
Metaphors referring to food and drink